Ixothraupis is a genus of Neotropical birds in the tanager family Thraupidae.

Taxonomy and species list
These species were formerly placed in the genus Tangara. A molecular phylogenetic study published in 2014 found that Tangara was polyphyletic. In the rearrangement to create monophyletic genera, the genus Ixothraupis was resurrected. It had been introduced by the French naturalist Charles Lucien Bonaparte in 1851 with the spotted tanager as the type species. The name combines the Ancient Greek ixos meaning "mistletoe" with "thraupis", an unknown small bird. 

The genus contains five species:

 Dotted tanager, Ixothraupis varia
 Rufous-throated tanager, Ixothraupis rufigula
 Spotted tanager, Ixothraupis punctata
 Speckled tanager, Ixothraupis guttata
 Yellow-bellied tanager, Ixothraupis xanthogastra

References

 
Bird genera
Taxa named by Charles Lucien Bonaparte